During the 2000–01 English football season, Crewe Alexandra F.C. competed in the Football League First Division, their 78th in the English Football League.

Season summary
A terrible first half of the 2000–01 season saw Crewe bottom at Christmas. Then with the emergence of Rob Hulse and Dean Ashton, Crewe went on a fantastic run, winning nine of their remaining matches to starve off relegation to finish 14th. A 3–1 defeat by Preston on 28 April finally saw the Alex beaten at home after an unbeaten run of nine in the league.

Final league table

Results
Crewe Alexandra's score comes first

Legend

Football League First Division

FA Cup

League Cup

Squad

Left club during season

References

Crewe Alexandra F.C. seasons
Crewe Alexandra